Paul MacLean or Paul McLean may refer to:

Paul D. MacLean (1913–2007), doctor and scientist who did extensive research on the human brain
Paul McLean (politician) (born 1937), Australian advocate of banking reform and senator for New South Wales, 1987–1991
Paul McLean (rugby union) (born 1953), Australian rugby union player and administrator
Paul MacLean (ice hockey) (born 1958), former professional ice hockey player and former head coach of the Ottawa Senators
Paul McLean (footballer, born 1964), Scottish footballer
Paul McLean (footballer, born 1990), Scottish footballer who plays for Brechin City
Paul McLean (Australian footballer) (born 1965), Australian footballer for Fitzroy
Paul Maclean, younger brother to Norman Maclean